The Polish–Swedish wars were a series of wars between the Polish–Lithuanian Commonwealth and Sweden. Broadly construed, the term refers to a series of wars between 1563 and 1721. More narrowly, it refers to particular wars between 1600 and 1629. These are the wars included under the broader use of the term:

the 16th century conflict sometimes referred to as the Livonian War (1558–1583)
the Northern Seven Years' War (1563–1570)
the War against Sigismund (1597-1598)
the war of 1600–1629 (sometimes considered a part of the larger trans-European Thirty Years' War) which was twice interrupted by periods of truce and can be divided into:
the war of 1600–1611
the war of 1617–1618
the war of 1621–1625
the war of 1626–1629
the conflicts in the second half of the 17th century known as The Deluge (part of the Northern Wars (1655–1660))
the Great Northern War (1700–1721)
the War of the Fourth Coalition (1806–1807), in which Poland, by then partitioned, was represented by the Polish Legions in Napoleonic service
the last Polish–Swedish war was the War of the Sixth Coalition, because the Duchy of Warsaw was a Napoleonic ally, whereas the Kingdom of Sweden was a member of the anti-Napoleonic coalition.

Livonian War

War against Sigismund 

The conflict between Polish–Lithuanian Commonwealth and Sweden can trace its roots to the War against Sigismund, where Sigismund III Vasa, at one time king of both the Commonwealth and Sweden, lost the throne of Sweden during the civil war (1597–1599). Few Commonwealth troops participated in this conflict, and it is mostly regarded as a Swedish civil war, not part of the Polish–Swedish wars. After early stalemate, Sigismund was defeated in the Battle of Stångebro in 1598 and by 1599, Sigismund was dethroned by his uncle, Duke Charles and forced to retreat to the Commonwealth. This also spelled the end of the short-lived personal union between Poland and Sweden.

Polish–Swedish War of 1600–1611 

However, even after being dethroned, Sigismund did not give up on regaining the Swedish throne, and from then on, most of his policies would revolve around his attempts to conquer Sweden, even though Commonwealth nobility had little will for such a long and bloody conflict. Sigismund started his plan in 1599, when he confirmed the pacta conventa, documents with promises he signed when elected as a King of Poland, which stated that the then-Swedish territory of Estonia would now become part of the Commonwealth. Polish nobility, the szlachta, supported this particular conflict, assuming it would be limited to Estonia only, and expecting many gains in form of new lands and increases of grain export through access to Estonian ports on the Baltic Sea. In addition, szlachta did not think highly of the Swedes, and did not expect this war to drag long or be difficult. They grossly underestimated their opponent, thinking that Poland, having been nearly undefeated in battle for over a hundred years, would be easily able to parry any attacks of the Scandinavians. The Commonwealth had nearly 10 million inhabitants, almost 10 times that of 1 million in Sweden. On the other hand, szlachta forgot that the Commonwealth had one of the smallest military to population ratios in Europe, and did not know that the Swedish army was highly trained and motivated.

Sweden was able to draft a large army much more quickly than the Commonwealth, due to its centralised government and obligatory draft of free peasants. The Commonwealth was forced to fight on two fronts, as its armies were also needed south to deal with the Moldavian Magnate Wars, and Swedish forces quickly gained 3:1 numerical superiority. In the beginning of the war, in 1600, although a Commonwealth army under command of Great Lithuanian Hetman Krzysztof Mikołaj "the Thunderbolt" Radziwiłł striking first was able to deal the Swedish forces several defeats in the open fields, Swedes took control not only of Estonia, but of most of Livonia, the Commonwealth territory south of Estonia (the entire region was known in Poland-Lithuania as Inflanty. The Polish-Lithuanian parliament, the Sejm, reacted by increasing funds for the army and recalling forces and commanders from the southern front (deemed less important as most of that war took part outside Commonwealth territory) to the threatened north.

In 1601 Lithuanian hetman Jan Karol Chodkiewicz and Polish chancellor Jan Zamoyski, recalled from Moldavia, arrived in Lithuania to fight the Swedish incursion, which now threatened not only the Estonia promised by Sigismund, but older Polish territories south of it. Chodkiewicz and Radziwiłł defeated the Swedes in the first major open battle of this war at Kokenhusen (Koknese) in early 1601. Soon afterwards, Jan Zamoyski, fresh from his victory against the Moldavians, came in to help against the Swedes, with 12,000 men, and 50 artillery pieces, 15 of which were classified as heavy. Charles was unable to deal effectively with such an army and was forced to retreat. However, during the retreat he left sizable numbers of defenders at various captured fortresses in Livonia. Zamoyski now took to siege warfare instead of chasing the retreating King, soon capturing Wolmar (Valmiera) and Fellin (Viljandi, Felin). By 1602, the Swedes were only left with control of Reval (Tallinn, Tallin, Rewl), Pernau (Pärnu, Parnau, Parnawa), Hapsal (Haapsalu, Hapsalu) and Dorpat (Tartu). However, Zamoyski, now 60 years old, had fallen ill and Chodkiewicz took command and laid siege to Dorpat. At Wesenberg (Rakvere), he defeated a Swedish reinforcement force sent in to help Dorpat, which was soon forced to surrender.

Chodkiewicz was appointed acting commander in chief of Lithuania forces after Zamoyski's return south in 1602 (Zamoyski would never return to lead the armies, his health deteriorated and he would die in 1605). Chodkiewicz, despite inadequate supplies and little support from the Commonwealth Sejm (parliament) and King Sigismund III Vasa, brilliantly distinguished himself, capturing fortress after fortress and repulsing the duke of Södermanland, afterwards Charles IX, from Riga (Ryga), however Reval, Pernau, and Narwa (Narva, Narew) remained under Swedish control. In 1604 he captured Dorpat, twice defeated the Swedish generals at Biały Kamień and near Weissenstein (Paide) (often winning against superior odds, like at Weissenstein where he had only 2,300 men and defeated a 6,000 man Swedish force; Chodkiewicz wrote in his memoirs this was a decisive battle and one of his greatest victories, with Polish-Lithuanian losses 81 dead, 100 wounded and Swedish losses approaching half of their army). For his valour Chodkiewicz was rewarded by the king with the grand hetman buława of Lithuania. However, the war was neglected by the Commonwealth's parliament, which turned a deaf ear to all his requests for reinforcements and for supplies and money to pay his soldiers. The Commonwealth's decentralised financial system (all taxes had to be agreed upon by all the nobility at Sejm and regional Sejmiks) meant that the Commonwealth treasury was almost always empty. This flaw plagued the Commonwealth for centuries.

Chodkiewicz nevertheless more than held his own against the Swedes. He instituted a new form of warfare based upon his use of the elite hussar cavalry and consequently the Swedes were repeatedly defeated in the open field. First the Commonwealth forces attacked Swedish cavalry, after which they usually attacked demoralised Swedish infantry which was unable to retreat at all, and usually annihilated whole formations of this infantry.

In 1605 the Swedes spent large sums of money to conscript a massive new army. Riksdag spent much cash on conscripting new formations, and as the Russian tsar Boris Godunov gave the Swedes much financial help, likely attempting to keep both Sweden and the Commonwealth busy during the Time of Troubles. The Swedes were able to hire large numbers of mercenaries, as well as hiring many siege engineers from all over Europe.

In 1605, a few miles from Reval, a 5,000-strong army led by Anders Lennartson landed in Estonia. Several days later another Swedish expedition, numbering around 4,000 and led by Count Frederick Joachim Mansfeld, landed near and besieged the fortress of Dünamünde (Daugavgriva, Dynemunt) near Riga, although without any success. After this setback they now began laying siege to Riga. Their main mission was to capture this important city, one of the largest Baltic ports.

Chodkiewicz moved in to relieve the garrison at Riga, but found that the Swedes were also sending in reinforcements under Lennartsson. Chodkiewicz moved in on Lennartsson, however he decided not to engage in open battle and retreated into a fortress. On finding out that Charles himself was now marching in with yet more reinforcements (around 5,000), Lennartsson decided to link up with the king and assault Riga together.

Chodkiewicz, who failed to prevent the Swedish forces from joining, moved from Cēsis (Kiesia) to near Kircholm (Salacpils, Salaspils) and Iskiel (Ikskile), where he built a small fortified camp. Charles, who arrived at Riga on 23 September, learned of the Chodkiewicz force nearby and decided to destroy it with an attack with the majority of Swedish forces within the area. On 27 September the Swedish force under King Charles moved towards Kircholm.

The Battle of Kircholm (Salaspils) on September 27, 1605, near Düna (Daugava, Dvina, Dźwina) River would be Chodkiewicz's crowning achievement. Chodkiewicz, having smaller forces (approximately at 1:3 disadvantage), used a 'feint' to force the Swedes off their high position. The Swedes under Charles thought that the Lithuanians with small support of Poles were retreating and, therefore, they advanced, spreading out their formations to give chase. This is what Chodkiewicz was waiting for. The Commonwealth's army now gave fire with their infantry causing the Swedes some losses, at which point the Hussars moved into a re-formation and charged at the Swedish infantry formations. The Swedish formations broke completely, the King himself fleeing, barely escaping back to his flotilla off the coast. Thus Chodkiewicz, with barely 3,600 troops, defeated an 11,000-man Swedish army, inflicting 5,500–9,000 casualties, for which feat he received letters of congratulation from the Pope, all the Catholic potentates of Europe, and even from the sultan of Turkey and the shah of Persia.

Yet this great victory was absolutely fruitless, owing to the domestic dissensions which prevailed in the Commonwealth during the following five years. Chodkiewicz's army, unpaid for years, abandoned him at last en masse in order to plunder the estates of their political opponents, leaving the hetman to carry on the war as best he could with a handful of mercenaries paid out of the pockets of himself and his friends. With tiny, inadequate forces, Chodkiewicz nonetheless prevented Swedes from overrunning the entire Inflanty region, helped by the relative inaction of Swedish commanders until 1608. Chodkiewicz, who was one of the magnates who remained loyal to the king, had to divide his attention between the rebellion against Sigismund in the Commonwealth (the Zebrzydowski rebellion, 1606–1609) and a fresh invasion of Livonia by the Swedes led by Mansfeld in 1608.

Mansfeld captured Dünamünde, Fellin, and Kokenhusen, but when Chodkiewicz returned, the tide turned. In 1609 Chodkiwicz once more he relieved Riga besides capturing Pernau. Chodkiewicz also defeated the Swedish flotilla at Salis and finally defeated Mansfeld's army once again near the river Gauja. Eventually, a truce was signed  in 1611 after the death of Charles IX. It would last until 1617 (or November 1620, conflicting sources). During the next decade, the Commonwealth was occupied with its aggression against Russia. Southern borders were also endangered by the constant troubles with Ottoman Empire during the Moldavian Magnate Wars.

Polish–Swedish War of 1621–1625 

Having signed the Treaty of Stolbovo ending their Ingrian War with Russia in 1617, the Swedes, led by King Gustav II Adolf (Gustavus Adolphus), who was hailed as saviour of Protestant Europe, turned their attention to the Commonwealth again. They have expanded their gains in the disputed Livonia region, taking Dünamünde and Pernau in 1617.

When the truce expired in November 1620, Gustav Adolf succeeded in taking the city of Riga after a few weeks of siege. The Commonwealth, occupied by a serious war with the Ottomans (battles of Cecora and Chocim) was unable to send significant forces to stop Gustav Adolf, and was forced to sign a truce favorable to Gustav Adolf. The Commonwealth was forced to cede Livonia north of Dvina (Düna) river, and retained only a nominal control over Riga. A new truce in Mittau (Jelgava, Mittawa) was signed and lasted from November 1622 to March 1625.

Polish–Swedish War of 1626–1629 

In 1625, the Swedes quickly occupied all of Livonia and Courland by the year's end. In the beginning of 1626, a Swedish army under Gustavus II Adolphus numbering 3,000 men, faced a Polish force twice as big at Wallhof under Jan Stanisław Sapieha Swedish casualties were reported as none whilst Polish casualties exceeded 2,000 men. In May 1626 Gustav Adolf began the surprising invasion of Prussia. Gustav's landing in Ducal Prussia near Pillau with over 8,000 soldiers came as a surprise to the Commonwealth and despite his relatively small forces, Gustav Adolf acting with the support of the Elector of Brandenburg quickly captured all of the coastal towns, with the exception of the largest prize: the city of Gdańsk (Danzig). The Commonwealth received no support from its vassal, Ducal Prussia. Near the village of Gniew in a battle (22–30 September 1626) Gustav defeated a Polish army led by King Sigismund. Sigismund retreated and called from reinforcements from other parts of the country.

Hetman Stanisław Koniecpolski's forces (4,200 light cavalry, 1,000 dragoons, 1,000 infantry) moved to Prussia with amazing speed. Strengthened by other units, he had 10,000 men against over 20,000-strong Swedish force. Using the tactic of maneuver warfare, with small mobile units striking at the enemy's communication lines and smaller units, he managed to stop the Swedish attack and force the units under Axel Oxenstierna, who also attempted to avoid battles with an overwhelming concentrated forces of Koniecpolski, into a defense. For a short time the war became a stalemate.

In the meantime, the Sejm (Commonwealth Parliament) agreed to raise money for the war, but the situation of the Polish forces was difficult. Lithuanian forces were dealt a serious defeat in December 1626 near Kokenhusen in Livonia and retreated behind the Dvina river. The Swedes planned to strike Koniecpolski from two directions - Oxenstierna from direction of the Vistula and Johann Streiff von Lawentstein and Maxymilian Teuffl from Swedish held Pomerania. The flooding of the Vistula disrupted their plans and allowed Koniecpolski to intercept the enemy units coming from Pomerania. 

Koniecpolski recaptured the town of Puck on 2 April. During the crossing of the Vistula near Kieżmark, in the vicinity of Danzig (Gdańsk), Gustav met the Polish forces and in the ensuing battle was wounded in the hip and forced to retreat. In July he led forces to lift the siege of Braniew, and lay siege to Orneta. Koniecpolski responded with the sudden attack and capture of Gniew. Gustav Adolf was reported to be impressed by the speed of Koniecpolski's reaction. With about 7,800 men (including 2,500 cavalry and hussars), Koniecpolski tried to stop the Swedish army from reaching Danzig near Dirschau (Gdańsk, near Tczew). On 7–8 August (or 18 September, sources vary), battle with the Swedish forces (10,000 men including 5,000 infantry) took place near the swamps of Mołtawa. The Swedes wanted to provoke the Poles into an attack and then destroy them with infantry fire and artillery, but Koniecpolski decided not to attack. The Swedes then took the initiative and attacked with cavalry, but did not manage to draw the Poles within the range of their fire. The consequent Swedish attacks managed to deal severe damage to Polish cavalry units, but did not manage to cripple the army (whose morale was kept high, thanks to Koniecpolski). The battle ended when Gustav Adolf was once again wounded and the Swedes retreated.

After the battle, Koniecpolski saw the need to reform the army and strengthen the firepower of infantry and artillery to match the Swedish units. The Swedes, on the other hand, learned arts of cavalry attacks, charges and melee combat from the Poles.

In March/April (dates vary) of 1627 near Czarne (Hamersztyn) Koniecpolski forced the Swedish forces to retreat inside the city, and three days later to surrender, leaving behind their banners and insignia. Some Swedish soldiers and mercenaries changed sides at that time. This victory also convinced the Elector of Brandenburg to declare his support for the Commonwealth, and the Lithuanian forces resumed the offensive in Inflanty.

Koniecpolski's insistence of taking the war to the seas resulted in the tiny and untested Polish–Lithuanian Commonwealth Navy of 9 ships to the defeat of a Swedish flotilla on 28 November 1627 (or 17 November, dates vary), at the Battle of Oliwa.

In 1628 the Polish forces, lacking funding, were forced to stop their offensive and switch to defense. Gustav Adolf captured Nowy and Brodnica. Koniecpolski counterattacked by using his small forces most efficiently - fast cavalry melee attacks combined with the supporting fire of infantry and artillery, and using fortifications and terrain advantage. By that time the war had become a war of maneuver with neither side willing to face the other without advantages of terrain or fortifications.

The Sejm decided to increase the funds for the war after the battle of Górzno, where Stanisław Potocki was defeated. The Catholic Austrian sent help to the Commonwealth in the form of units under field marshal Jan Jerzy Arnheim. A corps under Albrecht von Wallenstein also cooperated in Pomerania with Koniecpolski in 1629. Nonetheless, Koniecpolski was forced to withdraw Commonwealth forces from many strategic Polish strongholds in Prussia.

In time, hetman Koniecpolski managed to recapture Puck. The final battle took place on 27 June 1629 near Trzciana (or Trzcianka). The Swedes attacked in the direction of Graudenz (Grudziądz), were stopped, and retreated to Stuhm (Sztum) and Marienburg (Malbork). Koniecpolski attacked the rear guard led by Jan, Count of Ren, and destroyed it. He also repelled a counterattack by Swedish raitars, who were pushed in the direction of Pułkowice, where another counterattack was led by Gustav Adolf with 2,000 cavalrymen. This counterattack was also stopped, and the Swedish forces were saved by the last reserve units led by field marshal Herman Wrangel, who finally managed to stop the Polish attack. Swedish losses were heavy, especially in the cavalry regiments. Gustav Adolf said after the battle "I have never been in such a bath". 600 Swedes were killed, including the count of Ren and the son of Wrangel, Jan Wilhelm Reingraff, and 200 were captured. Polish losses were under 200 killed and injured.

However this victory was not followed up politically and militarily. Despite's all of Koniecpolski's brilliant efforts, a ceasefire in Stary Targ (Truce of Altmark) on 26 October 1629 was in favour of the Swedes, to whom Poland ceded the larger part of Livonia with the important port of Riga. Swedes also got the right to tax Polish trade moved through the Baltic (3.5% on the value of goods), kept control of many cities in Royal Prussia (including Baltiysk (Pillau, Piława), Memel and Elbląg (Elbing)) and for the time were generally recognized as the dominant power on the southern Baltic Sea coast. Duchy of Prussia was compensated by its losses (occupation of some cities by Swedes) by Commonwealth, with the temporary (until 1634) transfer of Malbork, Sztum and Żuławy Wiślane. Remaining ships of the Commonwealth fleet were transferred to Sweden. The Swedes only failure was their inability to capture the important port of Gdańsk. Gustav Adolf's biographer, Harte, noted that the king was furious "that a pacific commercial rabble should beat a set of illustrious fellows, who made fighting their profession". Nonetheless, Swedes now controlled almost all Baltic ports, with the exception of Danzig, Puck, Königsberg (Królewiec) and Liepāja (Libau, Libawa). This would be the closest Sweden ever got to realising its goal of making the Baltic Sea 'Sweden's inner lake'. After the treaty, Sweden used their prizes and money as a starting point in their entry into the Thirty Years' War and begun the invasion of northern Germany.

Treaty of Altmark would be revised in Commonwealth favour in 1635 (Treaty of Sztumska Wieś or Treaty of Stuhmsdorf), when Sweden, weakened by their losses in the Thirty Years' War, would retreat from some Baltic ports and stop taking the 3.5% tax.

The Deluge 

The Deluge occurred in the mid-17th-century which saw a series of campaigns conducted by the Polish–Lithuanian Commonwealth. The period followed the Khmelnytsky Uprising (1648) and was finalized by the Truce of Andrusovo (1667). Apart from the ongoing Russo-Polish war, the Poles had to contend with a Swedish invasion and the eventual occupation of the Commonwealth as part of the theatre of the Second Northern War (1655–1660). The Commonwealth lost around one-third of its population and saw its status as a great power greatly diminished due to invasions by Sweden and Russia. Warsaw, the capital of the Commonwealth, was destroyed by the Swedish Empire; by the end of the war a population of only 2,000 people remained as compared to 20,000 before the war. The invaders destroyed 188 cities and towns, 81 castles, and 136 churches in Poland.

Second Northern War 

As part of the Second Northern War, the Polish–Lithuanian Commonwealth fought against Sweden and its adversaries between 1655 and 1660. Sweden was allied with Brandenburg-Prussia while Poland was on the same side with Denmark–Norway and the Dutch Republic among others. When Charles X Gustav of Sweden invaded and occupied western Poland–Lithuania in 1655, the Grand Duchy of Lithuania became a Swedish fief, and the Commonwealth's armies surrendered; King John II Casimir Vasa of Poland meanwhile fled to the Habsburgs. The king would later manage to regain ground in 1656 but the war would later end with a Swedish victory.

The Great Northern War

War of the Fourth Coalition

War of the Sixth Coalition

See also

Further reading

17th-century conflicts
Wars involving the Polish–Lithuanian Commonwealth
Wars involving Sweden
Poland–Sweden relations
Lithuania–Sweden relations
Warfare of the Early Modern period
Polish-Swedish war